Walter Horton (born ca. 1512), of Catton, Derbyshire and Caloughdon, Warwickshire, was an English landowner in Derbyshire, briefly a member of parliament.

He was one of the two Members of the Parliament of England for Clitheroe in 1559.

References

1512 births
Year of death missing
People from South Derbyshire District
People from Coventry
English MPs 1559